Tina Parol (born Tina Annetta Borusowski, 1988) is an American singer-songwriter and record producer.

Biography 
Parol is a first generation American, born to Polish immigrants. She is still fluent in Polish. She was born in New Jersey and at age 2 moved to Buffalo, New York and grew up in West Seneca, New York. Parol attended New York University, enrolling in both the Clive Davis Department at Tisch School of the Arts, as well as NYU's Liberal Arts School. While still at NYU, Parol signed a record deal with Universal Motown which resulted in the pop radio single "Who's Got Your Money?", co-written and co-produced by Parol. The single charted to No. 34 on the Pop Airplay charts and had Parol touring around the country, opening for acts such as Flo Rida and Boys Like Girls. Soon Parol found her passion in songwriting taking her to Nashville, Tennessee, where she is a thriving member of the songwriting community. Her songs have been recorded by Britney Spears, Celine Dion, Sabrina Carpenter, Jamie Lynn Spears, Krewella, Jerrod Niemann, Dallas Smith, Kevin Rudolf, Haley Georgia and Jessie James Decker, to name a few. Her songs have also appeared on shows for Fox, ESPN, Lifetime, MTV, NBC, CBS, as well as two songs on ABC's "Nashville". Her song "Hold Onto Your Heart" appears in Touchstone Pictures's When in Rome. Tina co-wrote and performs "Live Your Story", Disney's Dream Big Princess franchise theme song. The song is frequently on The Disney Channel, is performed in Disney on Ice shows globally and is used at Disney's Hong Kong theme park. In 2020, along with Tenille Townes and Gordie Sampson, Tina won the CCMA for "Songwriter of the Year" for "Jersey on the Wall (I'm Just Asking)" performed by Tenille Townes. Tina co-wrote Lady A 's "Champagne Night", which was a #1 Billboard radio hit in both the USA and Canada and also went Gold in both countries.

Artist career
For her artist days, Parol cited artists such as Nelly Furtado, Bob Marley, Kanye West and M.I.A. as her biggest influences.  Parol's other major musical influences are The Police, ABBA, Queen, and Tina Turner, whom Tina is named after. Critics have compared her to Pink.
Parol toured with acts such as White Tie Affair, A Rocket to the Moon, The Audition, Cash Cash, Friday Night Boys, Kelsey and the Chaos, Mercy Mercedes, and Forever the Sickest Kids! She will also be performing at the 98 PXY Summer Jam Concert in Rochester, NY with artists such as Flo Rida and Boys Like Girls.

Studio albums 
Shrinking Violet (2010)

Singles

Songwriting discography

Songs co-written by Parol

References

1988 births
Living people
Motown artists
People from Westchester County, New York
Singer-songwriters from New York (state)
21st-century American singers
Canadian Country Music Association Songwriter(s) of the Year winners